Ženski košarkaški klub Radnički, commonly referred to as Radnički Kragujevac or SPD Radnički, is a women's professional basketball club based in Kragujevac, Serbia. It's a part of the Radnički multi-sports company. The club currently plays in Women's Serbian League.

History
The decision of the Radnički men's basketball club, with the approval of the Radnički Sports Association, in 1967 the Women's Club was formed. The first president was elected Professor Stevan Žilović, and the coach was Jovan Antić, known as Jova Piroćanac, who performed the first selection. In the first year of competition, the club is in Serbian league-South took the last place. It was only in 1971. year, began the serious work when the coach was Vlastimir Kovačević - Batica when they formed the pioneering schools in the primary school Svetozar Marković and Radoje Domanović. The separation of the male and female club coming in 1986. year. ŽKK Radnički five times in the highest ranks of the competition. In First National League Yugoslavia played in seasons: 1975-76, 1977–78, 1980–81 and 1986-87 (coach Rajko Levajac and Vlastimir Kovačević), and the First A league SRJ 1999-00.

The most famous dancer was Vesna Despotović, who is dressed shirt Yugoslavia 90 times in all selections and that the 22-year-long career has 21,240 points. The first is the athlete of Kragujevac to win an Olympic medal, and the bronze medal in Moscow in 1980. year. The owner and medals from the Balkan and European Championships. In addition to the Vesna Despotović in the national team have successfully and proudly played Snežana Pavlović, Mirjana Jovanović, Gordana Bogojević and Snežana Bozinović.

The greatest sports success in club history starts in 2008. when this small club enters the top league in Serbia, president of the club was Zvonko Ognjanovic, head coach Vladimir S. So from 2008. next 8 years the club was in the elite league of Serbia, the top place was 4th at the end of 2012–13 season.

Arena
Hall Gordana Goca Bogojević is a multi-purpose indoor arena located in the Kragujevac and it has a capacity of 600 seats.

Current roster

Notable former players
Vesna Despotović
Snežana Pavlović
Mirjana Jovanović
Gordana Bogojević
Snežana Bozinović
Nikolina Milić

Notable former coaches
Jovan Antić
Rajko Levajac
Vlastimir Kovačević
Vesna Despotović
Zoran Cvetanović

References

External links
  
 
 Profile on eurobasket.com
 Profile on srbijasport.net

SPD Radnički
Radnicki Kragujevac
Sport in Kragujevac
Women's basketball teams in Yugoslavia
Basketball teams established in 1967
1967 establishments in Serbia